Teodorowicz is a Polish language patronymic surname derived form the first name Theodore. Historical feminine form is Teodorowiczowa. Russified form: Teodorovich.

People with this surname include:

Ivan Teodorovich (Iwan Teodorowicz, 1875-1937), Russian Bolshevik of Polish descent
Józef Teodorowicz (Հովսէպ Թեոֆիլ Թեոդորովիչ, 1864–1938), the last Armenian Catholic Archbishop of Lviv
Katarzyna Teodorowicz-Lisowska (born 1972), Polish Olympic tennis player
Tadeusz Teodorowicz (1931-1965), Polish international speedway rider

References

Polish-language surnames
Patronymic surnames